Paulo Sérgio Rodrigues Theodoro (born September 15, 1991), better known as Taubaté, is a Brazilian footballer playing for the Comercial Futebol Clube.

Career
Taubaté began his career in the youth of Corinthians. In the junior team of Corinthians in 2010, was named by coach Mano Menezes to integrate the core team of Corinthians. He made his first-team debut for Corinthians on 5 September 2011 in a league match against Coritiba as a last 5 minutes substitute for Jorge Henrique.

Career statistics
(Correct )

Honours
Corinthians Paulista
Campeonato Paulista Infantil: 2006

Contract
 Contract with Corinthians until June 12, 2013.

References

External links
 ogol
 soccerway
 Notícias do Corinthians

1991 births
Living people
People from Taubaté
Footballers from São Paulo (state)
Brazilian footballers
Sport Club Corinthians Paulista players
Botafogo Futebol Clube (SP) players
Association football forwards